It's About Time is the debut studio album from the Jonas Brothers. It was released on August 8, 2006 through Columbia Records. The album was released through Columbia's Daylight Records imprint. A DualDisc of this version of the album was also released. The DualDisc version contains the complete 3-part video for the album's initial single, "Mandy".

One of the songs on the album, "Time for Me to Fly", was featured in the film Aquamarine in 2006.

After Columbia Records dropped the group from their roster list, they signed with Hollywood. Hollywood received the rights to distribute the single "Year 3000" which was also released on the group's first Hollywood Records album. The album also managed to sell 67,000 copies in the US. This was the entire initial shipment of the record. There was never a second shipment, since the band had been dropped by Columbia Records.

In August 2012, the Jonas Brothers announced the vinyl re-release of the album exclusively in the 2012 gift for premium members of Team Jonas along with a digital download with each vinyl album. The songs "What I Go to School For" and "Year 3000" are covers originally by English pop rock band Busted.

Singles

"Mandy" was sent to contemporary hit radio in the United States on March 20, 2006 as the first single from the album.

Tours
On November 5, 2005, Jonas Brothers began their first promo tour in support of the album. Their second tour, Jonas Brothers American Club Tour, promoted abstinence from illegal drugs. The tour consisted of gigs in clubs, and with small crowds. The tour started on January 28, 2006 and ended on March 3, 2006 with a total of 28 shows.

Vinyl release
In August 2012, the album was made available on vinyl as an exclusive gift for renewing or new premium members of Team Jonas. The vinyl release also includes a digital download of the album and a thank you note from Kevin, Joe and Nick. Select copies were autographed by the brothers and mailed out randomly along with one of three Jonas Brothers turntables by Crossley Turntables. Like the CD release, copies of the vinyl re-release are also rare to find as well as expensive if sold on eBay.

Track listing

Personnel
 Nick Jonas – lead vocals, guitar, keyboard, drums
 Joe Jonas – lead vocals, tambourine, keyboard
 Kevin Jonas – guitar, background vocals
 John Taylor – guitar
 Greg Garbowsky – bass guitar
 Alexander Noyes – drums

Charts

Sales

Release history

References

2006 debut albums
Jonas Brothers albums
Columbia Records albums
INO Records albums